Wilfredo Eduardo "Fefo" Ruiz Bruno (born June 1, 1962) is a retired Uruguayan professional basketball player. At a height of 1.92 m (6'3 ") tall, and a weight of 84 kg (185 lbs.), he played at the small forward position.

Professional career
During his club basketball career, Ruiz played in Uruguay, Argentina, and Brazil. On 12 November, 1983, while playing with Club Neptuno, he set the Uruguayan Federal Championship's all-time single game scoring record, when he scored 84 points in a league game against Colón. He finished his career in Uruguay as the Uruguayan Federal Championship's all-time leading scorer, having scored a total of 18,512 points in the league.

As a member of Estudiantes de Bahía Blanca, of the top-tier level Argentine League (LNB), he was the league's best scorer, during its first three years of existence (1985–1987).

National team career
In the FIBA World Cup of 1982, while playing with the senior men's Uruguayan national basketball team, Ruiz averaged 23.4 points per game. At the Summer Olympic Games in Los Angeles, in 1984, Ruiz was one of the leaders of the Uruguayan national team, along with Carlos Peinado and Horacio “Tato” López. The team finished the tournament in sixth place, and Ruiz averaged 19.5 points per game during the tournament.

References

External links
FIBA Profile 1
FIBA Profile 2
Sports-Reference.com Profile
Basketball-Reference.com Profile
 Fefo Ruiz: "Lo mejor en aquel momento fue el grupo humano que teníamos" 

1962 births
Living people
Basketball players at the 1984 Summer Olympics
Clube Atlético Monte Líbano basketball players
Club Atlético Peñarol basketball players
Club Atlético Welcome basketball players
Estudiantes de Bahía Blanca basketball players
Olimpo basketball players
Olympic basketball players of Uruguay
Small forwards
Uruguayan men's basketball players
1982 FIBA World Championship players
Uruguayan expatriate basketball people
Club Nacional de Football (basketball) players